Raorchestes anili (Anil's bush frog) is a species of frog in the family Rhacophoridae.

It is found in the Western Ghats in the state of Kerala in India.

Its habitats include roadside vegetation and gardens.

References

External links

External links 
 
 Photos at CalPhotos

anili
Endemic fauna of the Western Ghats
Fauna of Kerala
Frogs of India
Amphibians described in 2006
Taxa named by Sathyabhama Das Biju